Raymond Persinger (born 1959) is an American artist best known for his large bronze sculptures and public art installations.

Persinger has created sculptures for many public and private collections, including the City of Brea, California, Chapman University and the National Geographic Museum.  His work has been selected for various exhibits by prominent curators, including Smithsonian Institution curator Dr. Virginia Mecklenburg, curator and Los Angeles-based critic Peter Frank, and LACMA curator Michele Urton.

Life and career 
Persinger studied with Kenn Glenn, Stephen Werlick, Robert Graham and George Segal. He holds a bachelor's degree from California State University, Long Beach, and a Master of Fine Arts (MFA) from California State University, Fullerton.

In 1986, Persinger began working at Dinamation, where he created life-sized sculptures of dinosaurs, extinct mammals and sea creatures for use in museum exhibits and worked as project director and manager/art director of the sculpture department. He was credited for his claw structure theory in James Kirkland's original paper on the dinosaur Utahraptor. He left Dinamation in 1996.  Persinger also worked as a freelance artist for Disneyland’s Entertainment Arts.

Persinger was the sculpture program chair at the Laguna College of Art and Design from 1995 through 2013, during this period the sculpture program was considered one of the best figurative sculpture programs in the country.

In 2008, SIAS University in China's Henan Province invited Persinger and several other artists to participate in an International Sculpture Symposium. Persinger's finished sculpture will be placed at the entrance of the SIAS campus sculpture garden.  Persinger's work has been selected as an example of how public art is created on the PublicArt.org website.

As of 2008, Persinger was working on a Holocaust Monument project with poet and Holocaust survivor Peter Fischl.  This monument will be placed at several museums around the world.

Persinger has recently turned to relief images in glass that examine the spiritual connection between man and nature.

See also
Contemporary realism
Classical Realism

References
Notes

Bibliography
"For a Small Boys Sake" Chino Champion, August 16, 2008, Front Page.
"Professor Receives New Education in China" Laguna Beach Independent, 4 July 2008, Arts & Entertainment Page 1.
Walsh, Daniella  “Coastal Communities of Southern California:  Laguna, LaJolla and Beyond”   ARTnews, Summer 2004, Pages109-118.
Deffner, Elizabeth “Anniversary Celebration” Orange City News, September 20, 2001, Front Page.
Millet, Joe  “Interview with Raymond Persinger, Sculptor”  ArtSchools.com, July 2000.
“Art Institute of Southern California Adds the Figure to the California Landscape”  National Sculpture Society, January 2000, Page 15.
Becker, Jack  “Recent Projects”  Public Art Review, Spring/Summer 1996, Page 42.
Hill, Toby.  “Monumental Proportions; ‘Hero’s Journey’ honors firefighters” Brea Progress, April 14, 1994, Page A-3.
Rightmire, Mark.  “Hero’s Journey”  The Orange County Register, April 9, 1994, Metro 3.
“Retired Brea Fire Captain Honors Firefighters By Commissioning Statue” The California Fire Service Magazine, April, 1994, Page 49.
Epstein, Pancho.  “If it looks Like Chicken, it May be Representational” Santa Fe Star, May 3, 1991, Pages 8–9.
“The Iron Worker”  The Brea Line, May 1991.
Epstein, Pancho.  “Three Vie in Search of the Perfect Statue”  Santa Fe Star, April 27, 1991, Page 8.
Helton, Shelley.  “Artist Dream Comes True”  The Orange County Register, September 24, 1987, Local News Page one.
“Sculptor Ray Persinger and ‘Mustangs’  The Brea Line, October, 1985, Page One.
Caslas, Tammy.  “Traditional Bronze ‘Rides’ into Brea”  Daily Star Progress, September 27, 1985, Pages 1 & 9.

External links
 Artist's Website
 Current Glass Work
 Dinamation Images
 Holocaust Monument
 Article (See Back Page)
 ArtSchools.com Interview
 Dispatch News Article

American contemporary artists
20th-century American sculptors
American glass artists
American art educators
Public art
Living people
1959 births
21st-century American sculptors